Ramiro Otero Lugones, (9 November 1928 – 11 February 2013), was a Bolivian lawyer, docent and Human Rights defender.

He also worked as journalist for many newspapers and political magazines in different countries.

References

1928 births
2013 deaths
20th-century Bolivian lawyers
Bolivian journalists